Alpha Sigma Kappa – Women in Technical Studies  ( – WiTS) is a social sorority for women in the fields of mathematics, architecture, engineering, technology and the sciences.

The sorority was founded at the University of Minnesota in 1989 by a group of women who had formerly been affiliated with the Sisters of Triangle Fraternity program.  Alpha Sigma Kappa became a national organization in 1996 and currently consists of thirteen Active chapters, six Alumnae chapters and two Colonies.  The sorority overall does not have membership in any national Greek council; however, some individual chapters are affiliated with their local Panhellenic organizations.

History
Alpha Sigma Kappa originally grew out of a Little Sisters of Triangle organization at The University of Minnesota. In the late 1980s, Little Sister programs were being phased out by fraternal organizations across the country and Triangle Fraternity's National Council resolved to do so with their local Little Sisters organizations.  In order to maintain a formal relationship, The University of Minnesota's Little Sisters group chose to found Alpha Sigma Kappa.  The sorority was created on May 1, 1989, by eighteen Founding Sisters.

At the time that Alpha Sigma Kappa was founded, scientific careers were often filled primarily by men.  In 1989, only 17 percent of the students enrolled in the Institute of Technology at the University of Minnesota were female. The Founding Sisters of the organization wished to create a sorority dedicated to supporting women who entered these fields.  Alpha Sigma Kappa was intended to bring women pursuing technical studies together in a social setting: working to develop, encourage, and support the academic and social needs of these women.  At the time of founding, Alpha Sigma Kappa was the only social sorority for technical women whose scope included those in architecture and non-engineering sciences.

On March 4, 1996, an Interest Group of women was formed at the University of Oklahoma – Norman, which would ultimately become the Beta chapter on September 13, 1997.  The National Organization of Alpha Sigma Kappa was officially formed on April 29, 1996, at the first National Meeting in Minneapolis, MN.  Between 1999 and 2005, four more chapters were installed and, in 2010, Alpha Sigma Kappa became the first sorority established on the campus of New Mexico Tech.  Since 2015, the organization's growth has accelerated rapidly, establishing a presence on an additional ten universities across the United States as a social sorority for women in STEM.

In 2014, the Alpha Sigma Kappa Educational Foundation, a 501(c)(3) organization, was created to support women in technical fields by managing academic scholarships.

Purpose

The stated purpose of Alpha Sigma Kappa is to promote  friendship,  academic achievement, unity within the organization, and  philanthropy throughout the community.

The sorority states a quality goal of being women committed to achieving their academic goals and promoting women in technical fields through: leadership, friendship and support.

The sorority's Greek letter name, Alpha Sigma Kappa, is intended to represent social aspects; "Women in Technical Studies" specifies its membership.

Membership

Active membership in Alpha Sigma Kappa requires that a student pursues a major with a minimum of 1/3 of all credit hours in architecture, computer science, engineering, mathematics, physical sciences, or biological sciences, with a minimum of 1/6 of all credit hours as upper division courses in these fields. Specific majors at each university are defined in the respective chapter or Colony bylaws.

Once a woman is Initiated, her membership is for a lifetime.  Alumnae Sisters remain connected through Alumnae chapters as well as informal networks of social and professional support.

The National Organization of Alpha Sigma Kappa is not affiliated with a National Panhellenic governing body; however, chapters may be affiliated with councils at their respective universities.

Philanthropy

The National philanthropy for Alpha Sigma Kappa is DonorsChoose.  Individual chapters may choose local classroom projects to support through this organization, with an emphasis on assisting STEM projects.

Additionally, chapters of Alpha Sigma Kappa organize and participate in local philanthropic events in their communities.  Many events work to promote science and technical careers to young women. However, these events provide direct service or raise funds for a variety of nonprofit organizations, including: the American Cancer Society, Charity: Water, Girl Scouts of the USA, and the Susan G Komen Foundation.

Chapter List

See also
List of social fraternities and sororities
Professional fraternities and sororities

References

 
Student societies in the United States
Student organizations established in 1989
1989 establishments in Minnesota